White Tiger is the identity used by several fictional characters appearing in American comic books published by Marvel Comics.

Fictional character biography

Hector Ayala

The first White Tiger (Hector Ayala) was created by writer Bill Mantlo and artist George Pérez in the black and white Marvel magazine, Deadly Hands of Kung Fu in the early 1970s. Hector Ayala was born in San Juan, Puerto Rico. He could transform into the superhuman White Tiger through the power of the Jade Tiger amulets. In his alter-ego, Ayala fought foes such as the Corporation crime cartel and teamed with heroes including Daredevil and Spider-Man. After many years of fighting crime and nearly being killed, having his secret identity publicly exposed by the villainous Lightmaster and becoming psychologically and physically addicted to the tiger amulets, Ayala retired. But after a while, the call to don the amulets and fight evil became too strong and Hector once again became the White Tiger. Soon after, Hector was wrongly accused of murder and convicted despite the efforts of his lawyer, Matt Murdock (Daredevil). Ayala was shot and killed trying to escape, shortly before evidence emerged that belatedly proved his innocence.

White Tiger (Heroes for Hire)

The second White Tiger was an actual white Bengal tigress evolved into a woman of East Indian descent. She was part of the short-lived Heroes for Hire revival in the 1990s. She was created by the High Evolutionary to hunt down an evil evolved wolf he had created, called the Man-Beast. White Tiger's bestial origins gave her cat-like speed and reflexes, and she was highly skilled in martial arts. White Tiger met Iron Fist, and intrigued by him, joined Heroes for Hire. White Tiger tried to keep her origins a secret, but during a training session with Iron Fist, she lost control and reverted to her tiger form. She was a valued member of the team, but she found that human emotions were more complex than her tiger mind could handle. She found herself growing more and more attracted to Iron Fist. White Tiger attacked Misty Knight when she felt that Iron Fist was attracted to Misty, trying to display dominance to the encroaching female, just as a tigress would do in the wild. When White Tiger finally captured the rogue Man-Beast, she begged the High Evolutionary to remove her human persona, unable to bear the heartbreak of not being able to be with the man she loved. He conceded and turned her back into a white Bengal tiger, promising Iron Fist that he would return her to the rainforests where he found her.

Kasper Cole

The third White Tiger was Kevin "Kasper" Cole, a police officer of mixed Jewish/African-American heritage who impersonated Black Panther when he found T'Challa's costume. Advised by the Falcon (Sam Wilson) that he needed to be more than just a man in a cat suit to achieve his goals, Kasper sought permission to eat the heart-shaped herb and gain enhanced powers like T'Challa by undertaking the Rite of Ascension. The villainous Erik Killmonger, offered him another option: a synthetic version of the heart-shaped herb and help finding Sal's son, in return for Kasper dropping the Black Panther identity, becoming a White Tiger of the Panther Cult, and doing a favor for Killmonger in the future. Kasper accepted, but then tracked down the boy using his newly enhanced senses and help from Queen Divine Justice and Everett Ross, thus lessening his debt to Killmonger. Afterwards, Kasper took on the identity of the White Tiger. He continues to chase promotion, allied with The Crew (a team of inner city superheroes) against 66 Bridges and Triage.

The White Tiger wears a Vibranium-weave bulletproof costume. It can be cut only along the grain of the webbing, but cannot be punctured conventionally by blunt force. The boots have special Vibranium soles that absorb sound and impact, enabling him to leap off buildings up to 8 stories tall and land without injury. He can also run up the sides of buildings and walk on water. The suit's claws are retractable, and contain a new composite of the experimental "anti-metal" Vibranium, that can break down other metal alloys.

Angela del Toro

The fourth White Tiger is Hector Ayala's niece, Angela del Toro, an ex-FBI agent who worked on the Daredevil case, and inherited her uncle's Jade Tiger amulets. Angela quit the FBI to understand the amulets, and was trained in the use of their powers by Daredevil. Using the amulets' power to foil a robbery, she was touched by the overwhelming gratitude from the shopkeeper. Angela actually saved Daredevil from a crime lord and his bodyguard, using the amulets to give herself cat-like speed and fighting abilities. Realizing the powers she now possessed, she assumed her uncle's identity as the White Tiger. She was stabbed by Lady Bullseye and resurrected by the Hand, under their thrall until being healed by Black Tarantula. White Tiger received her own limited series in November 2006, written by Tamora Pierce. The Maker gave Angela an amulet from an alternate universe, which she used to confront the fifth White Tiger, Ava Ayala. Ava is forsaken by her Tiger God, and Angela gains the combined power of the two Tiger Gods.

Ava Ayala

The fifth White Tiger is Ava Ayala, the youngest sister of Hector Ayala. Ava first appeared in Avengers Academy #20 (December 2011) and was created by Christos Gage and Tom Raney. She appeared as a regular character in the series through its final issue #39 (Jan 2013) and appeared in the 2013 series Mighty Avengers. Ava also appears in Ultimate Spider-Man, voiced by Caitlyn Taylor Love where Ava is Hector's daughter instead of his sister.

Collected editions
Only one collection of issues has been published to date, which is based on the fourth White Tiger.

Angela del Toro

References

External links
  White Tiger's Shrine
 White Tiger (Angela Del Toro) at Marvel.com

 
Articles about multiple fictional characters
Marvel Comics superheroes
Marvel Comics martial artists
Comics characters introduced in 2011